Johannes "Hans" Plendl (6 December 1900 – 10 May 1991), German radar pioneer, was the scientist whose airplane navigation inventions made possible the early German bombing successes in World War II.

Early life
Plendl was born in 1900 in Munich, German Empire to parents from Northern Bavaria. His surname is most likely a truncated Bavarian dialect form of "Plendlein."

Plendl served briefly in the Imperial German Navy during World War I. Shortly thereafter, Plendl began his career as a radio and beam engineer for Telefunken corporation.

His early research into meter-wave propagation and radar beams necessitated additional names for newly discovered levels of the Earth's atmosphere, and Plendl is generally credited with coining the term ionosphere. In the early 1930s, he worked on developing the radio communications used in flights by civilian aircraft and the Hindenburg Zeppelin. His research and developments with the Lorenz beam landing system gave birth to what is now known as ILS, Instrument Landing System.

X-System
As Nazi Germany rearmed, Plendl and others saw the possibilities of using radio beams to guide bombers to their target, and they began to develop a system under the code name "X-System" (X-Verfahren). Using technology previously used for his Lorenz beam landing system, Plendl developed a system that would guide planes to their target, and which improved the accuracy of bombing at night or in poor weather conditions. This work was conducted for the German Airforce (Luftwaffe) at the Airforce Experimental Station (Erprobungstelle der Luftwaffe) at Rechlin, Germany, and also at Peenemünde. At the same time the system code named "Knickebein" was coined by the Telefunken electronics firm. Although it could use the Lorenz landing system for guidance, it was less accurate and more prone to jamming. Both systems employed transmitter towers on the English channel and the North Sea to transmit radar beams over targets in England. German bombers carried basic radar detectors and complex timing devices, also invented by Dr. Plendl, to lead them on the correct path and to guide the timing of the release of their bombs.

When Germany invaded Poland, the X-System was used effectively against military targets, but on a limited basis, due to the few planes equipped with the X-Device (X-Gerät, the electronic component of the system carried in the plane.) and the short duration of the campaign. During the air war over the England and Scotland known as The Battle of Britain the Knickebein, X-System and Y-System were all used extensively, but their effectiveness was diminished by countermeasures developed by Reginald Victor Jones and other British scientists, who were able use electronic countermeasures to redirect or jam the radio signals of the navigation systems in what has become known as the Battle of the Beams.

Dr. Plendl was given the title of state plenipotentiary and privy councillor (Staatsrat) by Hermann Göring for his work. He was named National Director of High Frequency Research (Bevollmächtigten der Hochfrequenzforschung).

Plendl was dismissed by the German High Command after holding the post for about a year and was replaced by Abraham Esau in December 1943. Sources differ as to why he was dismissed, including that it was after a heavy raid upon Hamburg where the British used a special counterradar technique called Window or chaff, or was due to his saving several people from death in concentration camps, by claiming he needed their (non-existent) "expertise" to help his beam program. Plendl's own account was that it was after he had a heated argument with Generaloberst Weise, the Chief of Flak over areas of responsibility after Plendl developed a new type of Flak shell.

Move to America
At the end of the war, Plendl surrendered to the Americans. Like other German scientists, he was invited to come to the United States to aid in American weapons development, as part of "Operation Paperclip." U.S. government records noted that he had regularly voiced opposition to the Nazi regime.

Particularly noteworthy was the fact that Plendl had saved a number of people, including many Jews, from the Dachau concentration camp, under the guise of needing them to work on his projects Many of these individuals had no scientific background. In this manner, Plendl differed from other German scientists, who voiced no opposition to the regime.

The most notable figure who Plendl saved was Hans Mayer, the author of the Oslo Report. In sending this report to the British Government in November 1939 just after the beginning of the war, Mayer performed perhaps the most serious breach of German security in World War II, although this was not known to his colleagues (or the Gestapo) at that time. Mayer had been the Director of the Siemens Research Laboratory in Berlin, up to his arrest in 1943 for listening to the BBC and criticising the Nazi regime. Plendl appointed Mayer to head a radio laboratory even though Mayer's expertise was in telephony, and not in radio.

Plendl finished his military career in the United States Air Force, at their Cambridge Research Laboratory. He specialized in the field of solid-state physics.

Later life
Plendl helped Karl-Otto Kiepenheuer establish a Europe-wide network of stations observing the solar activity in order to predict disturbances of the Ionosphere that interrupted the military radio connections. Plendl and Kiepenheuer may so be seen as the fathers of the science now called space weather, A considerable part of their network prevailed after the war in one or another organisation.

In 1970, Plendl retired to Europe, taking residence in Italy. R.V. Jones, the British scientist who had worked on the other end of the channel to jam Plendl's beams, became a good friend, and the two corresponded regularly and collaborated on several books.

Further reading
Brown, Louis. A Radar History of World War II. 
Jones, R.V. Most Secret War. 
Niehaus, Werner. Die Radarschlacht. William Kimber and Co.
Maier, Helmut Forschung als Waffe. Rüstungsforschung in der Kaiser-Wilhelm-Gesellschaft und das Kaiser-Wilhelm-Institut für Metallforschung 1900–1945/48. Bd. 2. Wallstein-Verlag, 2007, p. 776 p. 1012.
Price, Alfred. Instruments of Darkness. William Kimber and Co.
Ray, John The Night Blitz. 
Seiler, Michael P. 2006; Kommandosache "Sonnengott". Geschichte der deutschen Sonnenforschung im Dritten Reich und unter alliierter Besatzung. Frankfurt: Wissenschaftlicher Verlag Harri Deutsch
Trenkle, Fritz. Zum 90. Geburtstag von Hans Plendl, Funkgeschichte, 78: 3–5, 1991.
Wakefield, Ken. Pfadfinder: Luftwaffe Pathfinder Operations Over Britain, 1940–44.

Notes

1900 births
1991 deaths
German people of World War II
Scientists from Munich
People from the Kingdom of Bavaria
Radio pioneers
Operation Paperclip
German emigrants to the United States